Erickson Incorporated is an American aerospace manufacturing and aviation service provider based in Portland, Oregon, United States. Founded in 1971, it is known for producing and operating the S-64 Aircrane helicopter, which is used in aerial firefighting and other heavy-lift operations. Erickson Incorporated operates globally and has a fleet of 69 rotary-wing and fixed-wing aircraft including 20 S-64s. The company was known as Erickson Air-Crane Incorporated until 2014. Erickson's main facility is located in the Southern Oregon community of Central Point.

History
In 1969, Jack Erickson leased a Sikorsky S-61 helicopter from Wes Lematta of Columbia Helicopters to test the effectiveness of helicopters for logging. Following this test Erickson realized he would need a larger helicopter. He purchased three S-64 Skycranes from Sikorsky Aircraft and founded Erickson Air-Crane in December 1971. He quickly expanded the business to include power line construction and firefighting. In 1973, Erickson began using Aircranes to replace HVAC units on top of high-rises. The following year Erickson invented the anti-rotation device which stabilizes loads and provided for great performance and agility. This new technology allowed the company to begin building power line towers.

In 1992, Erickson Air-Crane purchased the type certification and manufacturing rights for the S-64 from Sikorsky. Since that time, Erickson Air-Crane has become the manufacturer and world's largest operator of S-64 Aircranes and has made over 1,350 improvements to the airframe, instrumentation, and payload capabilities of the helicopter.

In 2007, Erickson was sold to ZM Private Equity Fund, who in 2009 moved the company's headquarters to Portland. Then a privately held company, Erickson announced plans to go public in 2010, which was delayed into 2012. On April 11, 2012, the company completed an initial public offering and began trading on the NASDAQ market, with ZM Private Equity Fund retaining ownership of 63% of the company. The company acquired Evergreen International Aviation's helicopter unit for $250 million in March 2013. Erickson then bought Brazil-based HRT Participações em Petroleo's oil and gas unit, with the deal expected to be finalized in 2013.

The name of the company was changed to Erickson Inc. in February 2014. The following year the company reorganized into three business units: Commercial Aviation Services, Government Aviation Services, and Manufacturing and MRO.

The Evergreen purchase was financed partly with debt, and (together with challenging business conditions) caused Erickson to file for Chapter 11 bankruptcy in November 2016 to reorganize while keeping the business running. During bankruptcy the company returned to private ownership and emerged from bankruptcy protection in May 2017.

Erickson appointed government services veteran Doug Kitani as CEO and Director August 31, 2017. He was previously CEO and director of government services firm IAP Worldwide Services. He has also worked in private investment and general management for Honeywell and General Electric.

Heliport
The company owns Erickson Air-Crane Admin Offices Heliport , a private, 130 x 130 ft. (40 x 40 m) heliport.

See also
 Aerial firefighting
 Helitack
 List of companies based in Oregon

References

External links

 Erickson website

Helicopter manufacturers of the United States
Firefighting equipment
Companies based in Portland, Oregon
Companies that filed for Chapter 11 bankruptcy in 2016
Manufacturing companies established in 1971
Helicopter operators
Logging
Central Point, Oregon
Companies formerly listed on the Nasdaq
1971 establishments in Oregon
American companies established in 1971
Privately held companies based in Oregon
Aerial firefighting